Socken ( or ) is the name used for a part of a county in Sweden. In Denmark similar areas are known as sogn, in Norway sokn or sogn and in Finland pitäjä (socken). A socken is a country-side area that was formed around a church, typically in the Middle Ages. A socken originally served as a parish. Later it also served as a civil parish or an administrative parish, and became a predecessor to today's municipalities of Sweden, Finland, Norway and Denmark. Today it is a traditional area with frozen borders, in Sweden typically identical to those of the early 20th century country-side parishes. The socken also served as a registration unit for buildings, in Sweden recently replaced by identical districts as registration unit. A socken consists of several villages and industry localities (company towns), and is typically named after the main village and the original church.

Sweden

History 
Socken, in old Swedish sokn (compare: Danish and bokmål sogn, nynorsk sokn) is an archaic name for the original country church parishes, kyrksocken. It also describes a secular area, a sockenkommun ("rural area locality") or a taxation area, a jordbokssocken. In the Nordic countries a socken was an administrative area consisting of several villages or localities in much the same way as the civil parishes in England, but the concept is not used in reference to towns. A socken had a socken church, it was governed by a socken council and it was the predecessor to modern municipalities

In 1862, the kyrksockens ("church socken") and the sockenkommuns ("rural area locality") in Sweden were abolished as administrative areas during municipality reforms. The jordbrukssocken ("taxation area") remained in use until the Fastighetsdatareformen ("Reform for registration of real property") 1976–1995 was complete. No further alterations to the sockens was made after this.

On 1January 2016, a new administrative division and area for statistics, registration districts or simply districts, was introduced in Sweden. Geographically, the districts correspond with the parishes of the Church of Sweden as of 31December 1999. About 85% of the old sockens corresponds with the new districts.

Even though the term socken is no longer used administratively in Sweden, it is still used for cataloging and registering historical archives (Swedish National Heritage Board), botany, dialect research, toponymy and by local historical societies. Socken is a convenient parameter for these purposes since it does not change with time.

Lists of sockens 

 List of sockens in Sweden on Swedish Wikipedia, :sv:Kategori:Socknar i Sverige

See also 
 Administrative divisions of Sweden
 Civil parishes in England
 Historical region
 Hundred (county division)
 Municipalities of Sweden
 Parish (Denmark)
 Parishes of the Church of Sweden
 Soke (legal)
 Swedish municipal reforms of 1862
 Townships of the People's Republic of China

References

Further reading

External links 
 Swedish Tax Agency, Parishes in Sweden, historical–current.
 Swedish National Heritage Board, List of towns and sockens.

Types of populated places
Scandinavian history
Subdivisions of Sweden